Stranded with Sam and Colby is an American Reality Docu Series that airs on Snapchat. It premiered on October 23, 2019.

Premise 
The show documents YouTube stars Sam Golbach and Colby Brock exploring the abandoned ghost town of Centralia, Pennsylvania.

Cast 
Sam Golbach
Colby Brock 
Dominique Rivera
Myeia Coy
Luc Tougnant
Jake Donofrio
CJ Simons
Katrina Stuart
Aaliya Bacchus
Parijit Chahal ( Colby's girlfriend )
Janvi Tak

Production 
The show was announced in 2019. The series is produced by Bunim/Murray Productions, the same production company that produces Keeping Up with the Kardashians.

References 

Snap Inc.
2010s American reality television series
2019 American television series debuts
2019 American television series endings
Television series by Bunim/Murray Productions